Jonathan Arturo Aro (born October 10, 1990) is a Dominican professional baseball pitcher for the Mariachis de Guadalajara of the Mexican League. He made his Major League Baseball (MLB) debut with the Boston Red Sox in 2015 and has also played for the Seattle Mariners.

Career

Boston Red Sox
The Boston Red Sox signed Aro as an international free agent in June 2011. He grew up in the Dominican Republic idolizing Red Sox legend and Hall of Famer Pedro Martínez. His pitching repertoire includes a 91–93 mph fastball which occasionally reaches 95 mph, as well as an 83–85 mph changeup and a slurve at 78–81 mph with a short, 11-to-5 break, throwing most of them for strikes.

Aro made a fast ascent in the Boston Minor League system in a span of four years. After spending a full season each with the DSL Red Sox, GCL Red Sox, and Lowell Spinners from 2011 through 2013, he spent 2014 with the Salem Red Sox and the Greenville Drive. Besides, he was named a SoxProspects.com All-Star in both 2013 and 2014, and was also honored as South Atlantic League All-Star in the 2014 season, after finishing with a record of 1–3 and a 2.16 ERA and 10 saves in 25 games, including 74 strikeouts and 22 walks in  innings pitched. In his two stints, Aro went 3–8 with a 2.16 ERA and eight saves in  innings of work, setting the second lowest ERA in the Red Sox minors system in a minimum of 80 innings pitched, being surpassed only by Brian Johnson (2.13).

Aro joined the Portland Sea Dogs bullpen in 2015, where he posted a 3–2 record with a 2.28 ERA in eight appearances, striking out 19 and walking eight in  innings. He then appeared in his fourth level in less than ten months, after being promoted to the Pawtucket Red Sox in May 2015. On June 25, Aro earned a promotion to the Boston Red Sox. He was optioned July 2 after three appearances, then was recalled in September, making six total appearances with Boston for the season while recording an 0–1 record with 6.97 ERA. Aro was also the recipient of the Red Sox' Lou Gorman Award.

Seattle Mariners
On December 7, 2015, the Red Sox traded Aro and Wade Miley to the Seattle Mariners for Roenis Elías and Carson Smith. On January 26, 2017, Aro was designated for assignment by the Mariners. After clearing waivers, Aro was outrighted to the Triple-A Tacoma Rainiers on February 1. He elected free agency on November 6, 2017.

San Diego Padres
On November 27, 2017, Aro signed a minor league contract with the San Diego Padres. He became a free agent after the 2018 season.

Atlanta Braves
On January 18, 2019, Aro signed a minor league deal with the Atlanta Braves.

Guerreros de Oaxaca
On January 29, 2020, Aro signed with the Guerreros de Oaxaca of the Mexican League. Aro did not play in a game in 2020 due to the cancellation of the Mexican League season because of the COVID-19 pandemic. He was released by the Guerreros on November 18, 2020. On March 5, 2021, Aro re-signed with Oaxaca. Aro registered a 11.72 ERA in 7 games for Oaxaca before being released on June 15.

Mariachis de Guadalajara
On June 19, 2021, Aro signed with the Mariachis de Guadalajara of the Mexican League. In 19 appearances for Guadalajara, Aro registered a 2.95 ERA with 17 strikeouts in 18.1 innings of work.

Los Angeles Angels
On March 16, 2022, Aro signed a minor league deal with the Los Angeles Angels organization. Aro made 40 appearances (7 starts) for the Triple-A Salt Lake Bees, working to a 4–7 record and 6.03 ERA with 51 strikeouts and 3 saves in 62.2 innings pitched. He elected free agency on November 10, 2022.

Mariachis de Guadalajara (second stint)
On February 21, 2023, Aro signed with the Mariachis de Guadalajara of the Mexican League.

References

External links

1990 births
Boston Red Sox players
Dominican Republic expatriate baseball players in the United States
Dominican Republic expatriate baseball players in Mexico
Dominican Summer League Red Sox players
El Paso Chihuahuas players
Greenville Drive players
Guerreros de Oaxaca players
Gulf Coast Red Sox players
Living people
Lowell Spinners players
Major League Baseball pitchers
Major League Baseball players from the Dominican Republic
Mariachis de Guadalajara players
Mississippi Braves players
Pawtucket Red Sox players
People from La Vega Province
Portland Sea Dogs players
Salem Red Sox players
Seattle Mariners players
Tacoma Rainiers players
Tigres del Licey players